Highland Park Historic District is a national historic district located at Saranac Lake, town of St. Armand, in Essex County, New York. The district contains 21 contributing buildings and one contributing object.  It includes 17 private, single-family homes built between 1896 and 1930; most include "cure cottage" features.

It was listed on the National Register of Historic Places in 1992.

References

External links 
Historic Saranac Lake: Highland Park Historic District

Houses on the National Register of Historic Places in New York (state)
Historic districts on the National Register of Historic Places in New York (state)
Shingle Style architecture in New York (state)
Colonial Revival architecture in New York (state)
National Register of Historic Places in Essex County, New York